The 1962–63 OB I bajnokság season was the 26th season of the OB I bajnokság, the top level of ice hockey in Hungary. Six teams participated in the league, and Voros Meteor Budapest won the championship.

Regular season

External links
 Season on hockeyarchives.info

Hun
OB I bajnoksag seasons
1962–63 in Hungarian ice hockey